Tatsuhikari Kumagoro  (born Yoshimitsu Ishibashi, 25 October 1969 – February 24, 2011) was a former sumo wrestler from Shari, Hokkaidō, Japan. He made his professional debut in March 1985 and reached the top division in January 1992. His highest rank was maegashira 6. He retired from active competition in March 1999 and died in February 2011.

Career record

See also
List of sumo tournament second division champions
Glossary of sumo terms
List of past sumo wrestlers

References

1969 births
2011 deaths
Japanese sumo wrestlers
Sumo people from Hokkaido